Sudan Change Now is a Sudanese social and political movement aiming to achieve democratic, social, and economic, reform within Sudan. As stipulated in its charter, the focus of the group is on non-violent protest.

External links
Official Website
Facebook Account
Twitter Account

References

Political parties in Sudan
Sudanese democracy movements